Korahane (var. Korohan, Korohane) is a village and rural commune in Niger.

References

Communes of Maradi Region